Mannar (formerly spelled Manar) is the main town of Mannar District, Northern Province, Sri Lanka. It is governed by an Urban Council. The town is located on Mannar Island overlooking the Gulf of Mannar and is home to the historic Ketheeswaram temple. In the Tamil language, Mannar means the raised place [of sand] which is though to have come from the geology of Mannar Island which was formed by the accumulation of sand.

History
Formerly the town was renowned as a centre of pearl fishing, mentioned in the 2nd-century CE Periplus of the Erythraean Sea.

Mannar is known for its baobab trees and for its fort, built by the Portuguese in 1560 and taken by the Dutch in 1658 and rebuilt; its ramparts and bastions are intact, though the interior is largely destroyed.

Visually, the modern town is dominated by its churches, Hindu temples and mosques. The Catholic Church has a diocese headquartered in the town. By rail the town is connected to the rest of Sri Lanka by the Mannar Line. It was occupied by LTTE during Sri Lankan Civil War between 1983 and 2009.

See also 

 Manthai
 Talaimannar

References

External links
 Information on Mannar (Tamil)
 Official Mannar.com (Tamil)

 
Towns in Mannar District
Mannar DS Division